Chromodoris hamiltoni is a species of colourful sea slug, a dorid nudibranch, a marine gastropod mollusc in the family Chromodorididae.

Distribution
This species was described from Tanzania. It has been reported from Mozambique, South Africa, Madagascar and Réunion.

References

Chromodorididae
Gastropods described in 1977